Godda is a Silk City with a municipal Council in the Godda subdivision of the Godda district in the Indian state of Jharkhand. It is the headquarter of the Godda district.

History
As a consequence of the Santhal rebellion of 1845-55 the district of Santhal Paragna was created from portions of Bhagalpur and Birbhum. Godda was a part of undivided Santhal Pargana district until 1981 census. Later, the old Godda sub-division of Santhal Pargana was separated and formed as a new district. The district of Godda was created on 17 May 1983 out of old Santhal Pargana district which was upgraded to the level of division. Godda(M), the only one town of the district, is the headquarters of Godda district, Godda subdivision and Godda block.

Geography

Location
It has an average elevation of 77 metres (252 feet). Godda came into existence as the 55th district of undivided Bihar on 25 May 1983. After the bifurcation of Bihar into Jharkhand state on 15 November 2000, it was one of 18 districts of Jharkhand. National Highway 133 (NH-133) passes through the city of Godda.

Overview
Rajmahal coalfield is shown on the map. The entire area is overwhelmingly rural with only small pockets of urbanisation.

Note: The full screen map is interesting. All places marked on the map are linked and you can easily move on to another page of your choice. Enlarge the map to see what else is there – one gets railway links, many more road links and so on.

Demographics

Population

According to the 2011 Census of India, Godda had a total population of 48,480, of which 25,707 (53%) were males and 22,773 (47%) were females. Population in the age range 0–6 years was 6,745. The total number of literate persons in Godda was 4,1735 (84.30% of the population over 6 years).

Infrastructure
According to the District Census Handbook 2011, Godda, Godda covered an area of 8.59 km2. Panjwara Road railway station on the Dumka-Bhagalpur line is 20 km away. Among the civic amenities, it had 17.1 km roads with open drains, the protected water supply involved hand pump, uncovered well. It had 7,319 domestic electric connections, 350 road light points. Among the medical facilities, it had 4 hospitals, 3 dispensaries, 3 health centres, 1 family welfare centre, 1 maternity and child welfare centre, 1 maternity home, 1 TB hospital/ clinic, 1 nursing home, 4 charitable hospital/ nursing homes, 1 veterinary hospital, 12 medicine shops. Among the educational facilities it had 34 primary schools, 25 middle schools, 6 secondary schools, 5 senior secondary schools, 2 general degree colleges, 1 non-formal education centre (Sarva Shiksha Abhiyan). Among the social, cultural and recreational facilities, it had 1 orphanage home, 1 stadium, 1 cinema/ theatre, 1 auditorium/ community hall, 1 public library, 1 reading room. Two important commodities it produced were pattal (leaf plates), furniture. It had the branch offices of 12 nationalised banks, 2 private commercial banks, 1 cooperative bank.

Economy
Agriculture is predominant in the region and rice, wheat and maize are the main crops grown here, along with vegetables, linseeds and sugarcane. Fruits like mango, banana, jack fruit, plum are grown in the region. Some small and middle-scale industries are also present in Godda.

Godda saw industrialization in recent times and many major industrial projects came here. Jindal Steel & Powers at Tesubathan (Sunderpahari) came here with 1320 MW capacity of thermal power plant.

Adani Power is establishing its 1600 MW thermal power plant at Godda and it will become India's first power sector Special Economic Zone.

Rajmahal Coal Mining Ltd, a subsidiary of Aditya Birla Groups operates the mine of Eastern Coalfields at Mahagama. Lalmatia Colliery of ECL is one of the oldest and biggest mining projects in India. Eastern Coalfields also operates mines at Sunderpahari and Boarijore blocks of Godda.

Connectivity 
Godda is well connected with road and rail link. The Godda railway station is situated around 4 km from city center. Humsafar express was the first train depart from the Godda railway station on 8 April 2021. This weekly train will connect Godda to New Delhi via Bhagalpur and Gaya.

The national highway NH-133 passes through Godda.

Places of interest

Again Shaktipeeth at Pathargama is one of the Shakti Peetha of the Shaktism tradition in India. Here the thighs of Sati fell when she died and Shiva carried her body while tandava.

Basantrai was named after Raja Basant Rai, the ruler of the region. There is a big tank built by him. It is known for miraculous powers and according to legend, no one has ever been able to cross the tank from one end to another. Fairs are always organised at its bank for 15 days beginning from Chaita Sankranti festival i.e. 14 April.

Sunder Dam is the biggest irrigation project constructed on Sundar river near Rajabhitha village (Pathargama) and this is a beautiful picnic spot for the tourist.

Biodiversity Park Godda is a newly built park here and consists of various herbs and trees. It is a new point of attraction among local peoples and shooting for Santhali songs.

Notable people
Bhagwat Jha Azad: Former Chief minister of Bihar
Rameshwar Thakur: Former Governor of Madhya Pradesh
Kirti Azad : Former Cricketer, Team India.
Rashmi Jha: Bollywood Actress
Bharat Thakur: Famous Yoga Guru and Business Tycoon
Bhumika Chawla: Bollywood Actress, Daughter-in-law of Godda and wife of Bharat Thakur
Hemant Choudhary: Hindi TV and Bollywood Actor
Anil Kumar Jha: Former Chairman, Coal India Limited
S.K. Choudhary: Former Chief Secretary, Jharkhand.
Vibhash Chandra Jha : Vice Chancellor, Tilka Manjhi University, Bhagalpur
Pradeep Yadav: MLA, Poreyahat
Dipika Pandey Singh: MLA, Mahagama
Raghu Nandan Mandal: Former MLA, Godda
Amit Kumar Mandal: MLA, Godda

References

External links
Godda Administration Website 

Cities and towns in Anga Desh
Cities and towns in Godda district